12Stone Church (also known simply as "12Stone") is an American Wesleyan multi-site megachurch with multiple locations in Gwinnett County, Georgia. Kevin Myers is the founder and senior pastor of 12Stone.

As of September 2021, there are seven physical 12Stone campuses located in Gwinnett County, Georgia, and Hall County along with several home churches called "12Stone Home". 12Stone was listed in late 2010 as the #1 fastest growing church in America and as the fortieth largest church in the United States with an attendance of 9,636. 12Stone is the daughter church of Kentwood Community Church. In 2011 the average weekly attendance surpassed 10,000, making 12Stone the first Wesleyan Church to surpass this milestone. Each campus location has a Phoenix Roasters Coffee shop inside the church.

Locations
There are currently seven physical 12Stone campuses in Gwinnett and Hall counties and one temporary location in Jackson county.

 Lawrenceville (Central Campus) - 1322 Buford Drive, Lawrenceville, GA -
 Hamilton Mill - 3858 Braselton Hwy, Buford, GA -
 Flowery Branch - 4256 Martin Road, Flowery Branch, GA -
 Sugarloaf - 2050 Sugarloaf Circle Duluth, GA 30097
 Buford - 2565 Buford Hwy NE, Buford, GA 30518
 Braselton - 2675 Old Winder Highway, Braselton, GA 30517
 Snellville - 1709 Scenic Highway S, Snellville, GA 30078

Controversies
In 2014, 12Stone church was involved in the arrest and false conviction of David Justin Freeman, who had been a volunteer minister at the church. Freeman was arrested after 12stone pastor Jason Berry claimed Freeman had given him the middle finger, but Berry's testimony was impeached at trial. Freeman's conviction was ultimately overturned in 2017 on free speech grounds.

In 2016, 12Stone church was struck by vandals (whom the church reports did $10,000 worth of damage). The vandals left behind pamphlets describing their displeasure with the church's operations, and spray-painted scripture references suggesting that 12Stone church had turned God's house into a market.

The church and its head pastor have also made headlines for criticizing Colin Kaepernick's decision to protest by kneeling during the national anthem during a sermon, as well as a sermon in 2010 comparing acceptance of homosexuals to acceptance of pedophiles.

See Also
List of megachurches in the United States

References

External links
12stone.com 12Stone Official Website

Methodist megachurches in the United States
Megachurches in Georgia
Churches in Georgia (U.S. state)
Christian organizations established in 1987
1987 establishments in Georgia (U.S. state)